Tyto is a genus of birds consisting of true barn owls, grass owls and masked owls that collectively make up all the species within the subfamily Tytoninae of the barn owl family, Tytonidae.

Taxonomy
The genus Tyto was introduced in 1828 by the Swedish naturalist Gustaf Johan Billberg with the western barn owl as the type species. The name is from the Ancient Greek tutō meaning "owl".

The barn owl (Tyto alba) was formerly considered to have a global distribution with around 28 subspecies. In the list of birds maintained by Frank Gill, Pamela Rasmussen and David Donsker on behalf of the International Ornithological Committee (IOC) the barn owl is now split into four species: the western barn owl (Tyto alba) (10 subspecies), the American barn owl (Tyto furcata) (12 subspecies), the eastern barn owl (Tyto javanica) (7 subspecies) and the Andaman masked owl (Tyto deroepstorffi). This arrangement is followed here. Some support for this split was provided by a molecular phylogenetic study by Vera Uva and collaborators published in 2018 that compared the DNA sequences of three mitochondrial and one nuclear loci. This split has not been adopted by other taxonomic authorities such as the Clements Checklist of Birds of the World maintained by members of Cornell University or by the list maintained by BirdLife International that is used by the International Union for Conservation of Nature.

The cladogram below is based on the 2018 phylogenetic study. The Andaman masked owl (Tyto deroepstorffi) and Itombwe owl (Tyto prigoginei) were not sampled. The Manus masked owl (Tyto manusi) was embedded in a clade with subspecies of the Australian masked owl.

Throughout their evolutionary history, Tyto owls have shown a better capability to colonize islands than other owls. Several such island forms have become extinct, some long ago, but some in comparatively recent times. A number of insular barn owls from the Mediterranean and the Caribbean were very large or truly gigantic species.

Extant species
Seventeen species are recognized:

Extinct species
Known from ancient fossils
 Tyto sanctialbani (Middle - Late Miocene of Central Europe) - formerly in Strix; includes T. campiterrae
 Tyto robusta (Late Miocene/Early Pliocene of the Gargano Peninsula, Italy)
 Tyto gigantea (Late Miocene/Early Pliocene of the Gargano Peninsula, Italy)
 Tyto balearica (Late Miocene - Middle Pleistocene of the west-central Mediterranean)
 Tyto mourerchauvireae (Middle Pleistocene of Sicily, Mediterranean)
 Tyto jinniushanensis (Pleistocene of Jing Niu Shan, China)
Tyto maniola – Cuban Dwarf Barn Owl (Late Pleistocene of Cuba)
 Tyto sp. 1 
 Tyto sp. 2

Late prehistoric extinctions usually known from subfossil remains
 
 
 Mussau barn owl (Tyto cf. novaehollandiae) found in Mussau
 New Ireland greater barn owl (Tyto cf. novaehollandiae) found in New Ireland
 New Ireland lesser barn owl (Tyto cf. alba/aurantiaca) found in New Ireland
 New Caledonian barn owl (Tyto letocarti) found in New Caledonia - tentatively placed here
 Puerto Rican barn owl (Tyto cavatica) found in Puerto Rico - may still have existed up to 1912; possibly a subspecies of the ashy-faced owl (Tyto glaucops)
 Noel's barn owl (Tyto noeli) found in Cuba
 Rivero's barn owl (Tyto riveroi) found in Cuba
 Cuban barn owl (Tyto sp.) found in Cuba
 Hispaniolan barn owl (Tyto ostologa) found in Hispaniola
 Bahaman barn owl (Tyto pollens) found in Little Exuma, New Providence, and maybe Andros Island, the Bahamas - may have survived into the 16th century
 Barbuda barn owl (Tyto neddi) found in Barbuda and possibly Antigua
 Maltese barn owl (Tyto melitensis) found in Malta - formerly in Strix; possibly a paleosubspecies of Tyto alba

Former species
A number of owl fossils were at one time assigned to the present genus, but are nowadays placed elsewhere. While there are clear differences in osteology between typical owls and barn owls, there has been parallel evolution to some degree and thus isolated fossil bones cannot necessarily be assigned to either family without thorough study. Notably, the genus Strix has been misapplied by many early scientists as a "wastebasket taxon" for many owls, including Tyto.
 Tyto antiqua  (Late Eocene/Early Oligocene of Quercy? - Early Miocene of France) was a barn owl of the prehistoric genus Prosybris; this taxon might be a nomen nudum, as the species was originally described in Strix, this requires confirmation
 Tyto edwardsi (Late Miocene of Grive-Saint-Alban, France) was a strigid owl, but has not yet been reliably identified to a genus; it might belong in Strix or the European Ninox-like group.
 Tyto ignota (Middle Miocene of Sansan, France) was a strigid owl of unclear affinities; while it might belong into Strix, this requires confirmation
 "TMT 164", a distal left tarsometatarsus of a supposed Tyto from the Middle Miocene Grive-Saint-Alban (France); might also belong in Prosybris, as it is similar to Tyto antiqua

Description
They are darker on the back than the front, usually an orange-brown colour, the front being a paler version of the back or mottled, although there is considerable variation even amongst species. Tyto owls have a divided, heart-shaped facial disc, and lack the ear-like tufts of feathers found in many other owls. Tyto owls tend to be larger than bay owls. The name tyto (τυτώ) is onomatopeic Greek for owl.

Footnotes

References
 Ballmann, Peter (1969). Les Oiseaux miocènes de la Grive-Saint-Alban (Isère) [The Miocene birds of Grive-Saint-Alban (Isère)]. Geobios 2: 157–204. [French with English abstract]  (HTML abstract)
 Bruce, M.D. (1999). Family Tytonidae (Barn-owls). In: del Hoyo, J.; Elliott, A. & Sargatal, J. (eds): Handbook of Birds of the World Vol. 5 (Barn-owls to Hummingbirds): 34–75, plates 1–3. Lynx Edicions, Barcelona. 
 Mlíkovský, Jirí (2002). Cenozoic Birds of the World, Part 1: Europe. Ninox Press, Prague.  PDF fulltext 
 Olson, Storrs L. (1985). Section IX.C. Strigiformes. In: Farner, D.S.; King, J.R. & Parkes, Kenneth C. (eds.): Avian Biology 8: 129–132. Academic Press, New York.
 Steadman, David William (2006). Extinction and Biogeography of Tropical Pacific Birds. University of Chicago Press. .

External links
 
 

 
Bird genera
Extant Miocene first appearances